Shiraz University ( Dāneshgāh-e-Shirāz, formerly known as Pahlavi University دانشگاه پهلوی Dāneshgāh-e Pahlavi) is a public university located in Shiraz, Fars, Iran, established in 1946. Being one of the oldest and most prestigious modern universities in Iran, Shiraz University is listed among the top three research-oriented schools in the nation according to a ranking of Iranian universities based on scientific output. In the first report of state universities ranking and among almost 70 universities and higher education institutes, Shiraz University is regarded as first-level university.

Shiraz University has pioneered the establishment of doctoral programs in Iran. Currently and after the separation of medical universities from universities under Ministry of Science, Research and Technology the university has over 20,000 students, with 200 bachelor's degree programs (BA, BSc), 300 master's degree programs (MA, MSc), one professional degree program (Doctor of Veterinary Medicine or DVM), and 150 PhD programs.

History

Foundation 
Shiraz University traces its roots to 1946, with the establishment of a technical college aimed at training specialists in the medical sciences with a four-year program. Initially called the High Institute of Health, it developed into a medical school in 1950. In 1953, the Namazi School of Nursing and the Colleges of Agriculture and Arts and Sciences were established. With the addition of the College of Engineering and College of Veterinary Medicine in 1954, the school was elevated to university-status and named after the reigning Pahlavi dynasty.  Other units that were subsequently added were the Dental School in 1969, the Graduate School and College of Electronics in 1969, Dentistry in 1970, and the Colleges of Law and Education in 1977.

Pahlavi University 

In 1960, Mohammad Reza Pahlavi, Shah of Iran invited the atomic physicist Gaylord P. Harnwell, president of the University of Pennsylvania (Penn), to come to Iran and examine Iran's higher education institutions. At the Shah's request, Harnwell prepared a report entitled A Pattern for a New University in Iran, and the Shah subsequently decided that Penn would assist the Iranian government in transforming Pahlavi University into the only institution in Iran based on American-style higher education. The University of Pennsylvania thus became highly influential in shaping many of Pahlavi University's departments and institutions. Harnwell and Penn assisted the Iranian government in establishing American-style higher education by supervising the new university's academic and administrative system in its early years. Many faculty members from Penn were sent to Pahlavi University to teach and carry out research, and a widespread exchange program was established. The president of the University of Pennsylvania was awarded an honorary degree in Shiraz, in recognition of the help of Penn to Pahlavi University.

The development of Pahlavi University, as it then was, was directly under the supervision and management of this renowned American university, to the point that the scientific and cultural relations between the two universities became one of the strongest scientific and cultural relationships between Iran and the United States. This continued until the last days of the Shah. In 1962, Isa Sedigh became responsible for implementing the Ivy League's models at Pahlavi University. The development of many courses, the design and development of university campuses, the training of professors, and the establishment of many research institutes at Pahlavi University were all assigned to this Ivy League university. Later, during the administration of Houshang Nahavandi (fa), the famous Kent State University also participated in the formation and development of Pahlavi University.

Pahlavi University became the first university in Iran to receive an international-level accreditation for its degrees, as well as the first Iranian university where a Nobel Prize winner gave a lecture. In the Pahlavi era, Shiraz was called the sister of Princeton in the United States. Linus Pauling, scientist, peace activist, author, and winner of two Nobel Prizes, in Chemistry and Peace, came to Nowruz in Iran in 1975 at the invitation of the Iranian Society of Chemists to deliver a speech to the first Iranian Congress of Chemists. This congress was held at Pahlavi University.

The university was also the first in Iran to have a board of trustees. The members of this board were the minister of the court, the minister of culture, the chancellor of the university, the governor of Fars, the CEO of the Planning Organization, the CEO of the National Iranian Oil Company, and between nine and fifteen others, competent cultural and financial personalities and captains of industry, chosen by the Ministry of Court and Culture, with the approval of Mohammad Reza Shah Pahlavi, and appointed for a period of six months. The chairman of the board of trustees was the minister of the court, and in his absence the minister of culture. This board of trustees was the legal representative of the university at that time, and all scientific, technical, educational, financial, administrative and employment affairs of the university were managed under its supervision. Later, after the Iranian Revolution of 1979,  ministers Mostafa Moeen and Reza Malekzadeh, both university alumni, introduced a similar system for other universities in Iran.

After revolution
After the 1979 Islamic Revolution overthrew the Pahlavi dynasty, drastic changes were implemented at all universities. The name of Pahlavi University was immediately changed to Shiraz University. All universities were closed for three years in a so-called Iran's Cultural Revolution of 1980-1987 to Islamize all the universities. Later in 1986, the Iranian Ministry of Health, Treatment, and Medical Education took over the schools related to health and medical sciences including mainly Medicine, Dentistry, Pharmacy, and Nursing which resulted in the separation of these schools from the university campus and the establishment of Shiraz University of Medical Sciences. Also in 2004, former Electronic Industries College which was originally founded in 1968, was named Shiraz University of Technology as an independent university.

Since then, Shiraz University acted as "The Mother/Maternal University" and became responsible for the establishment of many later founded universities in the south of Iran including Hormozgan, Persian Gulf in Bushehr, Yasouj, Shiraz University of Technology, Fasa, Shiraz University of Arts among others. Shiraz University is also responsible for monitoring and evaluating 166 universities and institutes of higher education in Fars province. 

Shiraz University also pioneered many PhD programs for the first time in Iran. Among them are Organic chemistry and Chemistry-Physics.

Seal 
The official seal of the Shiraz University serves as the signature and symbol of authenticity on documents issued by the university. Before the Islamic Revolution in Iran, a logo was used as the official logo of Pahlavi University inspired by Persepolis. The logo was inscribed with two words; Wisdom and Endeavor. However, after the revolution, this logo was also changed.

After the Revolution, the later seal designed by the current faculty of Department of Arts, Bahman Feizabi inspired by the logo designed for The Asia Institute. According to him the basic motif for the new seal was inspired by the tree of life relief in Taq Bostan which is one of the most important motifs in the Sassanid era. The tree of life is a concept used in science, religion, philosophy, myth and other fields, and is represented as a branching tree that reflects the idea that all life is related to each other on Earth.

Campus

Eram Paradise Campus (main campus) 

Shiraz University has the second-biggest campus in Iran. The Eram Hill lands mostly owned by Shirazi tycoons Mohammad Namazi and Zabihollah Ghorban dedicated to university and was initially designed by American architect Minoru Yamasaki, who also designed the World Trade Center. Later in 1968 during the further constructing of the university campus and while Shiraz was getting ready to host its first Shiraz Arts Festival, many Iranian visual artists including Parviz Tanavoli, Sohrab Sepehri, Abolghasem Saeedi, Bahman Mohasses and Hossein Zenderoudi  got involved designing artistic elements and wall paintings for the amphitheater, self-service dining and outside the campus. From them a sculpture called I want my darling by Tanavoli is still kept at School of Arts and Architecture, a painting by Sepehri is kept in School of Persian Literature's lobby and a wall painting of Saeedi is also can be seen at the inner lobby of Fajr (formerly Shams) Hall.

In 1969, during the first Shiraz art festival, with the suggestion and invitation of Farah Pahlavi, then Queen of Iran a complex was designed by renowned contemporary architect, Alvar Aalto, for Shiraz Museum of Arts. The project halted due to the sudden death of Aalto in 1976. In 2016 Aalto University and Finnish embassy in Iran contacted Shiraz University regarding full documentation of design drafts by Aalto himself. In 2018, Shiraz Municipality and a two Iranian and Finnish investing partners got involved in project although the project halted once again because of new sanctions and lack of budget.

After more than 70 years, the university campus originally designed plan for central dormitory and school buildings is still not completed and is under construction under multi-year planning. After the 1979 revolution, many lands owned by the university divided due to different causes such as separation of Shiraz University of Medical Sciences, insufficiency of maintenance costs, lack of budget, urban planning, or other reasons.

The Asia Institute 
 

In 1966, the New York based Asia Institute under Arthur Upham Pope re-established itself under the university supervision at Narenjestan Museum. Narenjestan which was a house owned by Qavam family during Qajar Era housed this institution until 1979. The institute organized the Fifth International Congress of Iranian Art and Archaeology, which took place in Tehran in 1968. The institute aimed to promote the history, art, civilization, and culture of Iran and research related to it concerning the changes of culture in Asian countries. Also, their activities included holding training courses, Iranologic research, holding scientific and world meetings, archeological researches, and publishing its achievements.

With the death of Pope, the management of the institute was entrusted to Richard Nelson Frye. Before that, due to the Pope's close relationship with the Iranian royal family, the institute had autonomy, but after him, it went completely under the supervision of the Pahlavi University of Shiraz. This caused tensions in the institution. Among them, Houshang Nahavandi, then chancellor of Pahlavi University, claimed that Gluck, a member of the institute, was involved in smuggling Iranian antiques to Japan and demanded his removal. On the other hand, after receiving the title of professorship from Harvard University, Frye had less time to attend the institute. Despite all this, the research and educational activities of the institute continued. In 1971, on the eve of the celebrations of the 2,500-year celebration of the Persian Empire, the Asian Institute held a large seminar entitled "Iranian Studies" in Shiraz. In 1975, the institute's contract with Dr. Frye ended and Mahyar Navabi, who had previously been the executive director of the institute, was appointed president of the institute. He was the first Iranian president of the Asian Institute of Pahlavi University. At this time, the institute moved from Narenjestan to a larger building on the university campus and became a part of the university's linguistics department.

Biruni Observatory
Abu Reihan Biruni Observatory was set up and established by Yousef Sobouti in collaboration with Edward Guinan and Robert H. Koch in 1975. The idea to build this center was proposed by Yousef Sobouti in the late 1960s to promote observational astronomy and training a new generation of astronomers in Iran before building a large national telescope. In Fall 1969, Robert H. Koch (1929-2010), the head of the Department of Astronomy & Astrophysics of the University of Pennsylvania, visited Shiraz to evaluate a possible construction of an observatory for Shiraz University. He encouraged Shiraz University and proposed his suggestions for developing Astronomy in Iran. The idea pursued by Sobouti and in 1972, the telescope was finally ordered from the Astro Mechanics company in the United States of America with a cost of about 50K US dollars. Also, in 1976, Iranian Lady Shahla Solhju, one of Iran's very first female professional astronomers, became the first co-director of Abu Reihan Observatory.

The construction of the building and the observatory's road was started in 1972 and finished in 1976. The main telescope with a 20” (0.5 meters) primary mirror and the photoelectric photometer device was finally installed with the help of Edward Guinan, who was invited by Prof. Sobouti and became a staff member of the Physics department of Shiraz University (1975-1977). The telescope received its first light in March 1977. In its first 15 months, 1400 hours of observations were obtained and in 1978 the Biruni Observatory participated in several internationally coordinated programs involving ground-based and satellite observations.

The activities of this center have more or less continued over the past decades. Among the goals of this research center are professional research and observations in the field of astronomy and astrophysics. In this center, other activities such as education and training of students, promotion and dissemination of astronomical knowledge, etc. are carried out in addition to the previous objectives. The only astronomical center in Iran that can be compared to this observatory in terms of facilities and capabilities is the Khajeh Nasir al-Din Tusi Observatory of the University of Tabriz. Abu Reihan External Observatory of Shiraz University is the most active observatory center in the country and the first observatory after Maragheh observatory (8th century AH), which was established in Iran and has been the first among active and professional observatories in the field of research and astronomical observations.

Libraries 
Mulla Sadra Library was established in the early 1960s as the central library for Shiraz University and began its activities as a university library. Mulla Sadra Library is one of the richest university libraries due to its very scarce resources including books, dissertations, and publications and is considered as the only hub for maintaining basic science resources in the south of the country.

The Central Library and Documentation Center of Shiraz University is one of the largest university libraries in the country. The history of the establishment of the Central Library and Documentation Center of Shiraz University dates back to 1986. Before that, the library was part of Mulla Sadra's library at the Faculty of Science. In 1986, Mulla Sadra Library was divided into two parts and the collection related to literature and humanities was transferred to Mirza Shirazi Library. 
Now, with valuable collections of Persian and Latin books and reference books, archives of old and new magazines and newspapers, documents and manuscripts, and electronic scientific resources, it is one of the prominent university libraries in the country. The total infrastructure of the current building of the Central Library and Documentation Center is about 11,000 square meters and is designed on four floors.

Also, in 1964, with the establishment of the School of Engineering, the library started working with 22 volumes of dictionary books in the vicinity of the classrooms of Engineering Building No. 1. After the development of the faculty building, this library had a study hall, a publication hall, and a limited number of librarians on the second floor of Engineering School No. 1. The new building of the library named after Muhammad ibn Musa al-Khwarizmi, a prominent Muslim mathematician and the father of algebra and arithmetic, with an area of 7220 square meters in eight and a half sections and different sections, was put into operation in 1992. The complex has an amphitheater, central heating, and cooling system, central automatic fire extinguishing system, emergency power system, and many other facilities. Kharazmi Library has one of the richest technical and engineering resources in the country and has a capacity of 700 people at a time.

Other university libraries include the Shahid Mofteh Library for Agriculture, the Shahid Hasheminejad Library for Veterinary Medicine, the Law and Political Science Library, the Library of the School of Arts and Architecture, and the Library of the School of Agriculture and Natural Resources in Darab.

Academic profile

Reputation
The university is known to be strict and usually, the grade point average (GPA) of students is lower than their peers in other Iranian universities. Shiraz University is well known as a tough university with a low GPA especially in Civil, Electrical and Mechanical engineering. As such, many students of Shiraz University believe their grades do not reflect their academic performance.

Ranking

According to a report by the Ministry of Science, Research and Technology (Iran) published in 2010 and 2011, Shiraz University ranked 6th respectively between 64 and 68 non-medical universities and institutions in Iran. It was also one of the top three non-technical and non-medical universities along with the University of Tehran and Tarbiat Modares University in a 2012 ranking.

According to the 2017 rankings of the best universities given by the Times Higher Education, Shiraz University has been ranked in the top 3 universities in Iran. In 2016 only eight universities from Iran were included in this ranking, whereas in 2017, fourteen universities from Iran were among the top universities rankings. Based on these rankings, Shiraz University became the best comprehensive university in Iran.

Besides, regarding the 2019 rankings of the best universities given by the Times Higher Education (THE), Shiraz University's Computer discipline has been ranked in the top 3 universities in Iran. Also, based on the teaching criterion of the ranking in Computer Science, Shiraz University has achieved the first rank in Iran.

Iranian Science and Culture Hall of Fame members
Iranian Science and Culture Hall of Fame is a formal ceremony to honor influential contemporary scientific and cultural eminence. Many faculty and alumni have been receiving the award. Among them are:

 Mahmoud Yaghoubi - Mechanical Engineering 
 Mansour Rastegar Fasaei - Persian Literature and Iranology
 Habib Firouzabadi - Chemistry
 Keramatollah Izadpanah - Agriculture and Virology
 Afsaneh Safavi - Chemistry 
 Saeed Sohrabpour - Mechanical Engineering 
 Ali Akbar Hosseini Sarvi - Educational Psychology
 Arsalan Ghahramani  - Civil Engineering (Geotechnics)
 Mansour Taheri  -Chemical Engineering 
 Jafar Mehrad - Library and Information Science
 Mohammad Mehdi Alishahi - Aerospace Engineering

Athletics 
The first university horse manege was opened at Shiraz University in 2011.

Notable people

Chancellors

Notable faculty and alumni

 Asadollah Alam, former chancellor, a close advisor of Shah Mohammad Reza Pahlavi
 Masoud Alimohammadi, assassinated professor of quantum and elementary-particle physics
 Ali Babachahi. poet, writer, researcher, and literary critic
 Iraj Bashiri, professor of history, University of Minnesota
 Hossein Baharvand,  stem cell and developmental biologist and director of Royan Institute
 Seifollah Dad, screenwriter and filmmaker and former Administrator of Iranian Organization of Cinema and Audiovisual Affairs
 Gholam-Ali Haddad-Adel, Iranian politician and former chairman of the Iranian parliament
 Mansoor Hekmat, Iranian Marxist theorist and leader of the worker-communist movement
 Saleh Hosseini, retired professor of literature, translator, and critic
 Ahmad Jalali, Iranian scholar and philosopher
 Mohsen Kadivar, philosopher
 Fatemeh Keshavarz, academic, Rumi and Persian studies scholar, poet
 Maryam Keshavarz, filmmaker
 Leonard Lewisohn,  an American author, translator and lecturer in the area of Islamic studies and a specialist in Persian language and Sufi literature.
 Ebadollah S. Mahmoodian, Professor of Mathematics, Sharif University of Technology
 Hassan Makaremi, Iranian artist, painter, and calligrapher, psychoanalyst, and Human Rights Activist
 Reza Malekzadeh,  Iranian medical scientist and a gastroenterologist and former Minister of Health
 Mostafa Moeen, Iranian politician and Iran's former Minister of Culture and Higher Education and Minister of Science, Research and Technology
 Ata'ollah Mohajerani, former Minister of Culture and Islamic Guidance during Khatami's first presidency
 Ebrahim Nabavi, satirist, writer, diarist, and researcher
 Sadollah Nasiri Gheydari, professor of physics, University of Zanjan
 Reza Negarestani, philosopher and writer, alumnus, and former lecturer of mathematics in Shiraz University.
 Richard Nelson Frye, Director of the famous "Asia Institute" in Shiraz, and faculty member of Pahlavi University
 Mahmoud Nili Ahmadabadi, professor of metallurgy at University of Tehran and its current chancellor
 Mohammad Rasoulof, filmmaker
 Sohrab Rohani, The winners of the 2008 Ontario Professional Engineers Awards (OSPE), Chair of Department of Chemical and Biochemical Engineering at University of Western Ontario
 Bahram Parsaei, businessman, politician and former representative of Shiraz electoral district in Iranian Parliament.
 Gholamhossein Saber, painter, photographer, and teacher.
 Kourosh Safavi, linguist and translator, studied Chemical Engineering before moving to Tehran to study German language and literature.
 Alireza Shapour Shahbazi, Persian archaeologist, Iranologist and a world expert on Achaemenid archeology
 Yousef Sobouti, Faculty, Iranian physicist and former head of Physics Department at Shiraz University.
 Saeed Sohrabpour, Former faculty and alumnus, full professor of Mechanical Engineering and former chancellor of Sharif University of Technology and Imam Khomeini International University
 Mohammad Soleimani, former Minister of Communications
 Mohammad Tabibian, economist and former deputy director of the Planning and Budget Organization
 Alireza Tahmasbi, former Minister of Mines and Industry
 Jafar Towfighi, academic, former Minister and Minister senior consultant of Science, Research and Technology
 Mehdi Zeinoddin, former major general during Iran–Iraq War
 Nematollah Riazi, Professor of Physics, Shahid Beheshti University

See also
 Education in Iran
 Higher Education in Iran
 List of Iranian scientists
 Modern Iranian scientists and engineers

References

External links
 
 Shiraz University Central Library
 Shiraz University International Campus

 
Nursing schools in Iran
Education in Shiraz
Educational institutions established in 1946
1946 establishments in Iran
Buildings and structures in Shiraz